ATLS-9701 is a small unnamed U.S. Navy active service auxiliary Aerial Target Launch Ship operated by the Pacific Targets and Marine Operations Division (PTMO), U.S. Department of the Navy. The ship possesses VHF, UHF, Sat-Phone, NIPR/SIPRNET communication capabilities, equipped with Nobeltec Navigation system, and BQM-74 aerial targets launchers.

History

ATLS-9701 was built in 1998 for MQM-8G Vandal Targets program run by the Naval Air Systems Command. She was used for firing the MQM-8G super-sonic targets simulating cruise missiles, which were reconfigured RIM-8 Talos long-range naval surface-to-air missiles, in order to test the Phalanx and RIM close-range defensive systems deployed by the Navy. MQM-8G's were remote-controlled, non-recoverable vehicles, 36.2 feet in length, 7.3 feet in diameter, and weighing 8,225 pounds.

After the last MQM-8 targets were launched in 2005, the ATLS-9701 was converted to firing BQM-74 targets and also became a platform for the U.S. Marine Corps and the U.S. Navy for VBSS maritime training, confined space clearing, on-ship container access, and testing helicopter fast-roping skills, among other activities.

On April 4, 2013, ATLS-9701 was used by the members of the 13th MEU Maritime Raid Force, who fast-roped onto her from a CH-46 helicopter during VBSS training. On January 11, 2015, the 15th MEU Maritime Raid Force exercised their boarding skills on the ATLS-9701 in the San Diego Bay during interoperability training.

References

External links
 
 ATLS-9701

Auxiliary ships of the United States
1998 ships